SiriusDecisions, Inc. was a global B2B research and advisory firm with headquarters in Wilton, Connecticut. The company provided advisory, consulting and learning services to help executives improve the performance of their sales, marketing, and product strategies.

SiriusDecisions developed the "Demand Waterfall" model, which is widely used by B2B companies to describe and measure their lead-to-revenue funnel.

SiriusDecisions clients included Adobe, IBM, GE, HP, Cisco; SAP; and Motorola. Forrester Research acquired the company in 2018.

Company history
SiriusDecisions was founded in 2001 by current managing directors John Neeson and Richard Eldh.

SiriusDecisions has helped define many business marketing best practices and concepts, including lead scoring and marketing operations. Since 2005, the company's "Demand Waterfall®" model, (updated in 2012 to "The Rearchitected Demand Waterfall" and then to the "Demand Unit Waterfall™" in 2017) has been used by marketers to analyze their lead qualification process, from the inquiry stages through closed sales. The model introduced prominent B2B marketing terms, including marketing qualified lead (MQL) and sales qualified lead (SQL).

SiriusDecisions announced January 8, 2014, that it had received an investment from JMI Equity.

Along with its Wilton headquarters, the company has offices in London, Toronto, San Francisco, Waltham, Massachusetts, Austin and Singapore.

On November 27, 2018, the company announced that it would be acquired by Forrester Research.

Products and Services

SiriusDecisions’ research services provide information to help executives inform aspects of their marketing, sales and product strategies, including:

Account-Based Marketing
Brand and Communications
Channel Marketing
Channel Sales
Content Strategy and Operations
Customer Engagement
Demand Creation
Emerging Growth Strategies
Marketing Executive (CMO)
Marketing Operations
Portfolio Marketing
Product Management
Sales Enablement
Sales Executive (CSO)
Sales Operations

Conferences and Events
Since 2006, SiriusDecisions has hosted an annual SiriusDecisions Summit, which brings together marketing, sales, and product professionals and executives to discuss how intersections between their disciplines can be used to solve business problems. During the Summit, SiriusDecisions honors B2B organizations that develop innovative sales and marketing integration practices with its Return on Integration (ROI) Awards. The company also hosts a Summit Europe, Summit APAC, Summit Canada, and a Technology Exchange.

The Summit 2014 keynote speaker was author Malcolm Gladwell. Former United States Army General Stanley A. McChrystal delivered the Summit 2013 keynote address and SAP CMO Jonathan Becher gave the Summit 2012 keynote address.

Press Coverage
SiriusDecisions research and commentary from executives has been featured in Forbes, AdAge, CMO.com, Inc.com, Channel Marketer Report, CRM Magazine, Marketing Magazine and Demand Gen Report.

References

Marketing companies of the United States
Business-to-business